Pungaknaesan chongramdo (풍악내산총람도 楓岳內山摠覽圖) is a famous landscape painted by Jeong Seon during the reign of King Yeongjo. The title literally means "Overview of Mt. Pungak", the Autumn name of the Diamond Mountains. The painting is housed at the Gansong Art Museum.

Analysis

Jeong Seon produced many paintings of Mt. Geumgangsan. This painting is special, due to the choice of the season (Autumn). Moreover, quite all remarkable places are explicitly named.  The painting is of Naegeumgang, the Inner Mt. Geumgangsan and is obviously to be compared with the Geumgang jeondo.

On the bottom right, one can see a preeminent representation of the Rainbow bridge (Bihong—gyo, 飛虹橋), an arched bridge near the Changansa Temple. As documented by several scholar-officials who traveled in the area, however, this bridge was destroyed by flood in 1723. This rather indicates that the painting was done from sketches previously drawn, in the 1711-1712 travels to Geumgangsan, rather than painted from an immediate view in the 1740s. In this case, true-view landscape painting should be perceived as 진경산수화, 眞景山水畵, jinkyung landscape painting, meaning truthful-painting and not as  실경산수화, 實景山水畵 meaning real-view. The next travel of Jeong Seon to Mt. Geumgang was in 1747.

See also
Korean art
Jeong Seon

Sources
Gang Gwansik  
KAA.  original seems dead
MET.  catalog of the June 5, 1998—Jan. 24, 1999 exhibition. (fully available online as PDF). 
Gansong Museum.

References

Joseon dynasty
Korean painting